The Caledon River is a major river located in central South Africa.

Geography
The origin of the River Caledon is in the former bantustan of QwaQwa, near the border with Lesotho, southwest of Witsieshoek. It then flows south-west bordering Lesotho's capital city, Maseru. It forms the border between South Africa and Lesotho before entering South Africa's Free State province (north of Wepener). It then flows westward before joining the Orange River near Bethulie in southern Free State, just before flowing into the Gariep Dam. The land in the wedge between these two rivers forms the 22,000-ha Tussen-die-Riviere Nature Reserve.

River
The river is the primary source of water for Maseru, the capital of Lesotho, which stands on the river. During periods of low rainfall, water shortages can ensue. To combat this, several reservoirs have been created with structures such as the Muela Dam and the Meulspruit Dam. In 2003, water was released from here to avert drought.

The Caledon Valley is important in the history of the Basotho people. The area was exceptionally fertile and could be farmed without irrigation. This made it desirable and was one of the causes of the conflict between the Basotho and the Boers. Maize is grown on a large scale in the Caledon Valley.

See also
Basutoland

References

External links
Free State Region River Systems

Tributaries of the Orange River
Rivers of Lesotho
International rivers of Africa
Lesotho–South Africa border
Rivers of the Free State (province)
Border rivers